Lieutenant General Rizwan Akhtar  is a former three-star rank Pakistan Army general. He is a former spymaster who served as Director General of the ISI. He served from 8 November 2014 to 11 December 2016. On 8 Oct 2017, he announced his pre-mature retirement from the army.

Military career
Rizwan Akhtar was commissioned in the Pakistan Army in the Frontier Force Regiment in September 1982. He commanded an infantry brigade and infantry division in the Federally Administered Tribal Areas (FATA) after serving as Operation and Planning Officer at Peshawar Corps.

As Director General of the Pakistan Rangers in Sindh, Major General Rizwan Akhtar had been assigned with the task to lead the Karachi operation. Akhtar is also considered to have extensive experience of counterinsurgency from a previous posting in the border region of South Waziristan. After getting promoted to the rank of Lieutenant General in September 2014, he was posted as Director General of the ISI. He was the President of the National Defence University but took pre-mature retirement from the army in October 2017.

Academic career
Rizwan Akhtar is a graduate of the Command and Staff College in Quetta, National Defense University, Islamabad (NDU) and United States Army War College, Pennsylvania, USA. At the US Army War College, Akhtar authored a strategy research project report titled ‘US-Pakistan trust deficit and the war on terror’ in fulfillment of the requirements of the Master in Strategic Studies Degree.

Awards and decorations

Foreign decorations

References 

Living people
Pakistani generals
Frontier Force Regiment officers
Directors General of Inter-Services Intelligence
National Defence University, Pakistan alumni
Pakistani spies
Year of birth missing (living people)
Recipients of Hilal-e-Shujaat